The Savannah Pathfinders was the original name of the American minor league baseball franchise that represented Savannah, Georgia, during the 20th century.

While Savannah's minor league teams sported at least ten nicknames during the century, the predominant nickname was the Savannah Indians, which was used for 27 seasons (1906–1912; 1926–1928; 1936–1942; 1946–1954; 1970).  The name was not derived from an association with the Cleveland Major League Baseball franchise until , when Savannah served as the MLB Indians' Double-A farm system affiliate. In 1955–1960, 1962, and from 1968–1995, the Savannah team was named after its Major League parent. After 1926, the club played at Grayson Stadium.

For much of their existence, the Indians played in what became the Double-A Southern League, known before 1964 as the original South Atlantic League or "Sally" League. In 1926–1928, they competed in the Southeastern League. The Sally League franchise was founded as the Pathfinders in 1904 and dubbed the Colts from 1913–1915. From 1971–1983, Savannah's Southern League team was called the Savannah Braves, reflecting its link to the Atlanta Braves' organization. When this franchise relocated to Greenville in 1984, it was replaced by the Savannah Cardinals of the contemporary Single-A South Atlantic League; the Savannah team, known as the Savannah Sand Gnats since 1996, moved to Columbia, South Carolina in 2016, and was in turn replaced by a new, independent franchise, the Savannah Bananas.

Between 1904 and 1970, Savannah won seven Sally League championships.

Notable alumni (1904–1970)
 
Joe Astroth
Joe Azcue
Gene Bearden
Lou Brissie
Jack Brohamer
Don Buford
Leo Cárdenas
Donn Clendenon
Ripper Collins
Dave DeBusschere
Art Ditmar
Bob Elliott
Nick Etten
Curt Flood
Toby Harrah
Shoeless Joe Jackson
Ken Johnson
Alex Kellner
Al McBean
Gene Michael
Bugs Raymond
Cookie Rojas
Connie Ryan
Bob Watson

References

Savannah, Georgia, Baseball Reference

Defunct Southern League (1964–present) teams
Chicago White Sox minor league affiliates
Cleveland Guardians minor league affiliates
Cincinnati Reds minor league affiliates
Houston Astros minor league affiliates
Kansas City Athletics minor league affiliates
Philadelphia Athletics minor league affiliates
Pittsburgh Pirates minor league affiliates
Washington Senators (1961–1971) minor league affiliates
Professional baseball teams in Georgia (U.S. state)
1904 establishments in Georgia (U.S. state)
1970 disestablishments in Georgia (U.S. state)
Baseball teams established in 1904
Baseball teams disestablished in 1970
Baseball teams in Savannah, Georgia
South Atlantic League (1904–1963) teams
Defunct baseball teams in Georgia
Defunct South Atlantic League teams